Exile The Second (stylized as EXILE THE SECOND, formerly known as THE SECOND from EXILE), or simply The Second, is a Japanese music group comprising Exile members Kenchi, Keiji, Tetsuya, Nesmith, Shokichi and Akira. Formed in 2012, the group is managed by LDH and is signed to the Avex Group record label Rhythm Zone.

The group retired after releasing one album, and the members officially joined their main group Exile in 2009.

The date of February 22 means the "Exile The Second Day".

History

2007-2012: Formation and debut 
In January 2007, Exile announced that they would hold an audition to recruit new members for the second generation of J Soul Brothers. Nesmith and Shokichi, finalists of the EXILE VOCAL BATTLE AUDITION, were the first members to join the new generation in August 2007. Performers Kenchi, Keiji, and Tetsuya were soon added. Three months later, performers Naoto and Naoki were added, and they gave their debut performances at Color's 2007 nationwide tour, COLOR LIVE TOUR 2007: BLUE. The second generation, called Nidaime J Soul Brothers, released their debut single "WE!" in May 2008 under the indie label Rhythm Republic. Nidaime J Soul Brothers announced their hiatus after the release of their first self-titled album J Soul Brothers in February 2009. A month later, all Nidaime members joined the line-up of Exile. Members Naoto and Naoki stayed behind to re-join J Soul Brothers' third generation, the Sandaime J Soul Brothers.

On July 1, 2012, during Exile Tribe's tour EXILE TRIBE LIVE TOUR 2012 ~TOWER OF WISH~, the formation of THE SECOND from EXILE as a unit from Exile was officially announced. The group activities started on November 7 of the same year with their debut single "THINK 'BOUT IT!". A day after, the group held their first live performance at GirlsAward by 2012 AUTUMN / WINTER.

2013-2015: First album THE II AGE and Exile Tribe Perfect Year 2014 
On August 14, 2013, the group their 2nd single "SURVIVORS feat. DJ MAKIDAI from EXILE / Pride".

On February 5, 2014, they released their first album, THE II AGE. It sold over 51.000 copies in the first week of its release and thus became their first album to top Oricon's weekly albums chart. The group also participated in Exile Tribe's EXILE TRIBE PERFECT YEAR LIVE TOUR TOWER OF WISH 2014 ~THE REVOLUTION~ tour in 2014.

After the release of their first album in 2014, the group went on an indefinite hiatus, only doing activities as members of Exile.

On December 4, 2015, Kenchi Tachibana was announced as leader of Exile The Second.

2016: Name change, addition of Akira and first tour 
On May 20, the group changed its name from THE SECOND from EXILE to EXILE THE SECOND.

On June 6, they announced their 3rd single "YEAH!! YEAH!! YEAH!!", to be released on July 13.

On September 5, LDH announced that Exile's member Akira would join the group, making Exile The Second a 6-member group. Prior to joining the group, he appeared in the music videos of their last two singles "YEAH!! YEAH!! YEAH!!" and "Shut up!! Shut up!! Shut up!!".

On September 21, the group released their 5th single "WILD WILD WILD". The title track was used as the official theme song for the Japanese release of the movie Suicide Squad. The single ranked #1 on Oricon's weekly single chart.

The group held their first nationwide tour EXILE THE SECOND LIVE TOUR 2016-2017 "WILD WILD WARRIORS" from October 29, 2016, until May 14, 2017.

2017: Second album BORN TO BE WILD and second tour 
On March 1, the group released their second album "BORN TO BE WILD". It sold over 62.000 copies in the first week of its release and topped Oricon's weekly album chart.

On April 16, Exile The Second were invited as the final performers of AbemaTV 1st ANNIVERSARY LIVE at EX THEATER ROPPONGI in Tokyo.

On June 28, the group released their 7th single "Summer Lover".

On September 27, the group released their 8th single "Route 66". The music video for the title track was directed by Dave Meyers, this being his first work for a J-pop artist. The single also included live footage from the final performance of the group's first arena tour EXILE THE SECOND LIVE TOUR 2016-2017 "WILD WILD WARRIORS".

On October 28, the group started their second tour EXILE THE SECOND LIVE TOUR 2017-2018 "ROUTE 6・6", that went until May 24, 2018.

2018: Third album Highway Star 
On February 20, 2018, the group released their 9th single "Acacia".

On March 28, one year after the release of their album "BORN TO BE WILD", they released their third album titled "Highway Star".

On May 14, it was announced that Exile The Second's song "Hi Noboru Hikari ni ~ Pray for Now ~ " (日昇る光に ～Pray for Now～; Sunlight rising to Pray for Now) was chosen as the official support song for the Japanese Judo Federation during the 2020 Tokyo Olympics.

On May 23, the group released their first live DVD titled EXILE THE SECOND LIVE TOUR 2017-2018 "ROUTE 6・6". It sold over 18.000 copies in the first week of its release and topped Oricon's weekly DVD ranking. Combined with the sales of the Blu-ray Disc version, Exile The Second's first video work sold over 27.000 units in the first week.

During the last concert of their EXILE THE SECOND LIVE TOUR 2017-2018 "ROUTE 6・6" THE FINAL at Makuhari Messe on May 24, Exile appeared as a surprise guest for the first time together after two and a half years of hiatus. Additionally, they announced the release date of their new album and the details of their first nationwide dome tour in 3 years.

The group also participated in Exile's EXILE LIVE TOUR 2018 "STAR OF WISH" that went from September 15, 2018, until February 11, 2019.

2019-present: Singles 
On September 17, 2019, it was announced they would digitally release two new songs, "Top Down" and "Ain't Afraid To Die" on October 4. Both songs will be used in the TV drama HiGH&LOW THE WORST EPISODE.O. and the movie HiGH&LOW: THE WORST.

On October 1, 2019, it was announced that the group would collaborate with Italian racing car brand ABARTH for their "SCORPION SPIRIT CAMPAIGN". It would be the third project in a new series that reflects the world of ABARTH which features Japanese photographer KEI OGATA. The collaboration with Exile The Second would revolve around "Sound", after the first project was themed "Style" and the second one "Performance". For this occasion, the group would release a new music video and will also be featured in the ABARTH Brand Movie that is going to be released on November 9.

Furthermore, it was announced that Exile The Second and Exile would release a split single on January 1, 2020, as the first release of LDH PERFECT YEAR 2020. The new song of Exile The Second is titled "Shunkan Eternal" (瞬間エターナル; Moment Eternal) while Exile's new sing is titled "Ai no Tame ni ～ for love, for a child ～" (愛のために ～ for love, for a child ～; For Love ～ for love, for a child ～). "Shunkan Eternal" was also appointed as the title song for the new "Suit & Coat Basketball" TV commercial from Aoyama Prestige Technology starring group members Nesmith and Shokichi.

Members

Discography

Studio albums

Best albums

Singles

As lead artists

Digital singles

Live

As a lead artist

As a participating group

Awards and nominations

MTV Video Music Awards Japan
The MTV Video Music Awards Japan is a music awards show hosted annually by MTV Japan.

|-
|rowspan="1"| 2016
| "Shut up!! Shut up!! Shut up!!!"
| Best Group Video
|

Notes

References

External links
 

2007 establishments in Japan
2012 establishments in Japan
Avex Group artists
Japanese pop music groups
Musical groups established in 2007
Musical groups established in 2012
Musical groups from Tokyo
Japanese boy bands
LDH (company) artists